The Boys' Singles tournament of the 2014 Asian Junior Badminton Championships was held from February 19–23 in Taipei, Taiwan. The defending champions of the last edition was Soo Teck Zhi from Malaysia. Aditya Joshi, Jonatan Christie and Zhao Junpeng were the top 3 seeded this year. Shi Yuqi of China emerged as the champion after beat Kanta Tsuneyama of Japan in the finals with the score 19–21, 21–16, 21–16.

Seeded

  Aditya Joshi (second round)
  Jonatan Christie (quarter-final)
  Zhao Junpeng (semi-final)
  Cheam June Wei (second round)
  Shi Yuqi (champion)
  Pham Cao Cuong (quarter-final)
  Ryan Ng Zin Rei (second round)
  Anthony Sinisuka Ginting (quarter-final)

Draw

Finals

Top Half

Section 1

Section 2

Section 3

Section 4

Bottom Half

Section 5

Section 6

Section 7

Section 8

References

External links 
Main Draw

2014 Asian Junior Badminton Championships